Huave may refer to:
 Huave people, an ethnic group of Mexico
 Huave language, their language

See also 
 Hoava, a language of the Solomon Islands
 Huabei
 Huawei